Sumiya (Dargwa: Сумиямахьи) is a rural locality (a selo) in Duakarsky Selsoviet, Dakhadayevsky District, Republic of Dagestan, Russia. The population was 149 as of 2010.

Geography 
Sumiya is located 36 km southwest of Urkarakh (the district's administrative centre) by road. Duakar and Karbuchimakhi are the nearest rural localities.

Nationalities 
Dargins live there.

References 

Rural localities in Dakhadayevsky District